The Zacatecas shrew (Sorex emarginatus) is a species of mammal in the family Soricidae. It is endemic to Mexico. It inhabits the southeastern Sierra Madre Occidental of Durango, Zacatecas, and Jalisco states, from  elevation.

References

Endemic mammals of Mexico
Fauna of the Sierra Madre Occidental
Sorex
Taxonomy articles created by Polbot
Mammals described in 1925